Leo Timmers (born 1970) is a Belgian children's book writer and illustrator. He started creating comics when he was 8 or 9 years old, and self-published one of them a few years later. He studied graphic design and published his first real book, Blij met mij, in 2000.

His 2019 book Monkey on the Run was listed as one of the 10 best illustrated books of the year by the New York Times. In 2022, Elephant Island was listed as one of the 10 best children's books of the year by the New York Times. His works have been translated in at least 25 languages.

Two of his works have been turned into animated series: Ziggy and the zootram and Derek the Deep-Sea Doctor.

Bibliography
Timmers has published many books, below is a selection of those that have been translated in English.
Kind Crocodile
Elephant Island
Where is the dragon
Monkey on the Run.
Busy builders, busy week
Franky
Bang
All through my town
The magical life of mr. Renny
Crow
Who is driving?
Een huis voor Harry was awarded "Picture Book of the Year" of 2019 in the Netherlands

Notes

1970 births
Living people
Belgian children's writers
Belgian children's book illustrators